Adela thorpella is a moth of the Adelidae family or fairy longhorn moths. It was described by Powell in 1969. It is found in California.

The forewings are olivaceous-bronze, reflecting metallic brass, at times overlaid with pale yellowish scales and either without markings or (more usually) at least a trace of a white spot pattern. The hindwings are brown, faintly reflecting purplish.

Etymology
The species is named for Robbin W. Thorp.

References

Adelidae
Endemic fauna of California
Moths described in 1969
Moths of North America
Fauna without expected TNC conservation status